Robert de Faryngton, or de Farrington (died 1405) was an English-born cleric, judge and statesman who became Lord High Treasurer of Ireland. As a cleric, he was notorious for pluralism, but he enjoyed the trust of three successive English monarchs.

Family

Little is known of his early life. Of his family, we know that he had at least one brother Nicholas, on whose behalf he petitioned the King in 1398, and a cousin, Hugh de Faryngton, who accompanied him to Ireland in 1395 and became a judge there. It is unknown whether they had any connection to the prominent de Faryngton family of Evesham, Worcestershire.

Early career

Robert is first heard of in 1370 as a clerk in the Court of Chancery. He was in holy orders. Even in an age when such behaviour was commonplace, he was a notorious pluralist who acquired a remarkable number of benefices and prebends, which included Blackawton, Ludlow, Bishopstrow, Harlow, Morthen, St. Clether and St. Dunstan-in-the East. In 1375 he was awarded the prebendary of Aust, recently vacated by the philosopher John Wycliffe. On this occasion however he clashed with the King's third son John of Gaunt, Wycliffe's most powerful protector and the dominant figure in the English government, who persuaded King Edward III that Wycliffe was still entitled to the prebend. The grant to de Faryngton was cancelled: he was compensated with another prebendary in Lincoln, with which, it has been said, he was content, "at least in the short term".

Career  in Ireland

Despite his reputation for acquisitiveness, he was clearly highly regarded as an administrator. In 1395 he was sent to Ireland as Master of the Rolls in Ireland. His tenure as a judge was brief, but it allowed him to gain the customary right of the Master of the Rolls to be appointed a prebend of St. Patrick's Cathedral, Dublin, and he was also given another prebend at Lusk. It is interesting that the King in 1395 gave a gift to the Chapter of St. Patrick's "on account of their poverty". Robert on the  King's instructions also confirmed the charter for the Priory of All Hallows outside Dublin.

In 1397, when he appears to have been with the Royal Court at Westminster, he was described once again as a "King's clerk", though by now a very senior one. The Crown authorised a payment to Robert, to be shared with Sir Jenico d'Artois (a Gascon-born knight who was high in the Crown service in Ireland), for the marriages of the three daughters of the late Sir Robert  Ufford (sometimes styled Lord Clavering) and his widow Eleanor Felton, daughter of Sir Thomas Felton, who were royal wards. Of the three girls, Sybilla became a nun, but suitable husbands were found for her sisters, Joan and Ela.

Lord  Treasurer 

In 1398 King Richard II appointed de Faryngton Lord High Treasurer of Ireland. In the same year Robert petitioned the King that his brother Nicholas de Faryngton should not be forced to take up any public office against his will, and the King granted the petition in person, perhaps an indication of the high regard in which Robert was held by the Crown. Further evidence of his good standing at Court is his second successful petition, also dating from 1398, to be granted a tun, or two pipes, of Gascony wine every Christmas for the rest of his life.

Richard II was deposed in the following year, but the new King Henry IV, who probably knew de Faryngton personally, re-appointed him as Lord Treasurer of Ireland. It was Faryngton himself who evidently asked to be relieved of his duties: he stepped down as Treasurer in May 1400 and returned to England. He resumed his old position in the Chancery and was promoted to the rank of "clerk of the first degree". He died in 1405.

Legacy 

His cousin Hugh de Faryngton, a clerk in the service of the Crown and former treasurer of Salisbury Cathedral, accompanied him to Ireland and became a Baron of the Court of Exchequer (Ireland) in 1399. In the following year he was sitting on a judicial commission with Richard Rede, the Chief Baron of the Irish Exchequer.

It is less clear whether Philip Faryngton, an official in the  Court of Chancery (Ireland) in the 1420s, was a relative. Philip was the Court "spigurnal", i.e. the official who affixed the royal seal to the writs.

References

Lord High Treasurers of Ireland
1405 deaths
Masters of the Rolls in Ireland